Mayzod Elizabeth Hodgson (née Reid, 30 August 1928 − 13 November 2001) was a New Zealand diver who represented her country at the 1950 British Empire Games.

Early life and family
Born Mayzod Elizabeth Reid, Hodgson was born in Dunedin on 30 August 1928, the daughter of Daisy Agnes Reid (née Scott) and Arthur Alexander Reid, a doctor. As an 18-year-old in 1946, she played in what is believed to have been the first women's rugby union tournament in New Zealand, held at Carisbrook.

Swimming and diving
Reid twice won the New Zealand national intermediate girls' diving championship, and went on to win the New Zealand national women's diving championship in 1946, 1947, and 1948.

She then competed for New Zealand at the 1950 British Empire Games in Auckland where she finished sixth in the women's 3 m springboard.

Later life and death
On 31 August 1951, Reid married Clifford William Hodgson in Auckland and the couple went on to have four children. Mayzod Hodgson was widowed by the death of her husband in 1983. She died in Auckland on 13 November 2001 and her ashes were buried at Purewa Cemetery.

References

1928 births
2001 deaths
Sportspeople from Dunedin
New Zealand female rugby union players
New Zealand female divers
Commonwealth Games competitors for New Zealand
Divers at the 1950 British Empire Games
Burials at Purewa Cemetery